William James Perry (1887–1949), usually known as W. J. Perry, was a leader in cultural anthropology at University College, London.

Megalith culture, according to him, was transmitted to the rest of the world from Egypt.

He was a convinced hyperdiffusionist and collaborated with Grafton Elliot Smith. He was also interested in the history of religion. His daughter, a chemist, Margaret, married the eminent physiologist, Professor Robert Harkness.

Publications
The Megalithic Culture of Indonesia (1918)
[https://archive.org/details/in.ernet.dli.2015.283090/page/n3/mode/2upThe Children of the Sun: a Study in the Early History of Civilization] (London: Methuen, 1923); alternate title: The Children of the Sun: A Study of the Egyptian Settlement of the Pacific
The Origin of Magic and Religion (1923)
The Growth of Civilization (1924)
Gods and Men: The Attainment of Immortality (1927)
The Primordial Ocean: An Introductory Contribution to Social Psychology (1935)

References

1887 births
1949 deaths
Academics of University College London
British anthropologists
Hyperdiffusionism
20th-century anthropologists